RMS (or SS) Knight of Malta was a cargo liner built by Swan, Hunter & Wigham Richardson Ltd in 1929. She was owned and operated by Cassar Co. Ltd. in Malta. During World War II, she was requisitioned by the Admiralty as an armed boarding vessel and stores carrier. She ran aground off Libya on the night of 2–3 March 1941, with no casualties.

Description
The Knight of Malta had a tonnage of 1553 GRT or 656 NRT. The vessel had a triple-expansion engine, and she was propelled by a screw propeller.

Career
The Knight of Malta was built by Swan, Hunter & Wigham Richardson Ltd at the Neptune Yard, Low Walker in Newcastle upon Tyne. She was launched on 2 October 1929 and was completed the following December. The vessel was owned by Cassar Co. Ltd. in Malta. The vessel entered service on 21 February 1930, and it operated between Malta and Syracuse or Tunis. The Knight of Malta was the first purpose-built vessel to operate on a Malta-Sicily route. The Knight of Malta had her own paquebot postmark which was applied to mail posted on board.

After World War II broke out, the vessel was requisitioned by the Admiralty in July 1940. She was initially an armed boarding vessel, but was later used as a stores carrier.

The Knight of Malta was wrecked on the night of 2–3 March 1941. There were no casualties. The destroyer HMS Wryneck was sent to determine the possibility of salvage, and the ship's cargo was salved. On 8 March, the Egyptian steamer Star of Mex also ran aground nearby, but she was towed successfully to Alexandria. Salvage of the Knight of Malta was abandoned on 10 March, after the corvette HMS Peony and the tug St Issey were attacked.

Legacy
In 1986, the vessel was depicted on a Malta postage stamp and on a Lm5 silver commemorative coin.

Notes

References

1929 ships
Ships built by Swan Hunter
Cargo liners
Steamships of Malta
Merchant ships of Malta
Passenger ships of Malta
Steamships of the United Kingdom
Merchant ships of the United Kingdom
Passenger ships of the United Kingdom
Maritime incidents in March 1941
World War II shipwrecks in the Mediterranean Sea